Sivas is a city in Turkey. 

Sivas may also refer to:

Sivas (electoral district), Grand National Assembly of Turkey
Sivas Province, Turkey
Sivas Airport, Sivas, Turkey
Sivas Congress, 1919 assembly of the Turkish National Movement
Sivas Vilayet, Ottoman Empire
Sivas massacre, events of July 2, 1993 against Turkish Alevi intellectuals 
Sivas (film), a 2014 Turkish film

See also
Sivas Kumru Güvercin, or Sivas Dove Pigeon, quite petite pigeon originated from Turkey
Sivas (rapper), stylized as S!vas (real name Sivas Torbati), Danish rapper of Iranian origin
Siva (disambiguation)